Kim Byoung-jun (Korean: 김병준; born 15 August 1991) is a South Korean athlete specialising in the high hurdles. He represented his country at the 2017 World Championships without advancing from the first round. Additionally, he won a silver medal at the 2014 Asian Games and a bronze at the 2015 Asian Championships.

His personal bests are 13.39 seconds in the 110 metres hurdles (+0.3 m/s, Bangkok 2017) and 7.86 seconds in the 60 metres hurdles (Flagstaff 2014). The first one is the current national record.

International competitions

1Did not start in the final

References

1991 births
Living people
South Korean male hurdlers
World Athletics Championships athletes for South Korea
Athletes (track and field) at the 2014 Asian Games
Athletes (track and field) at the 2018 Asian Games
Sportspeople from North Gyeongsang Province
Asian Games medalists in athletics (track and field)
Asian Games silver medalists for South Korea
Medalists at the 2014 Asian Games
21st-century South Korean people